This is a list of Polish television related events from 2014.

Events
23 May - Pierwsza miłość actress Aneta Zając and her partner Stefano Terrazzino win the fourteenth series of Taniec z Gwiazdami.
24 May - Juan Carlos Cano wins the fourth series of The Voice of Poland.
31 May - Artem Furman wins the fourth series of X Factor.
27 November - M jak miłość actress Agnieszka Sienkiewicz and her partner Stefano Terrazzino win the fifteenth series of Taniec z Gwiazdami.
6 December - 15-year-old singer Adrian Makar wins the seventh series of Mam talent!. Aleksandra Nizio wins the fifth series of The Voice of Poland on the same evening.

Debuts
Taniec z gwiazdami (2005-2011, 2014–present)

Television shows

1990s
Klan (1997–present)

2000s
M jak miłość (2000–present)
Na Wspólnej (2003–present)
Pierwsza miłość (2004–present)
Dzień Dobry TVN (2005–present)
Mam talent! (2008–present)

2010s
The Voice of Poland (2011–present)
X Factor (2011–present)

Ending this year

Births

Deaths

See also
2014 in Poland